The 1967–68 NBA season was the Detroit Pistons' 20th season in the NBA and 11th season in the city of Detroit.  The team played at Cobo Arena in Detroit.

Expansion in the NBA, with new teams in San Diego and Seattle, forced the league to move to the deeper Eastern Conference. Still, Detroit improved significantly, finishing 40-42 (.488), 4th in the Eastern Division.  The team advanced to the playoffs for the first time since 1963, losing in the division semi-finals to the eventual NBA champion Boston Celtics 4-2.  Detroit was led on the season by guard Dave Bing (27.1 ppg, 6.4 apg, NBA All-Star) and forward Dave DeBusschere (17.9 ppg, 13.5 rpg, NBA All-Star).

Regular season

Season standings

x – clinched playoff spot

Record vs. opponents

Game log

Playoffs

|- align="center" bgcolor="#ffcccc"
| 1
| March 24
| @ Boston
| L 116–123
| Dave Bing (30)
| Dave DeBusschere (24)
| Dave Bing (6)
| Boston Garden7,591
| 0–1
|- align="center" bgcolor="#ccffcc"
| 2
| March 25
| Boston
| W 126–116
| Dave Bing (24)
| Joe Strawder (14)
| Dave Bing (5)
| Cobo Arena10,109
| 1–1
|- align="center" bgcolor="#ccffcc"
| 3
| March 27
| @ Boston
| W 109–98
| Dave Bing (27)
| Dave DeBusschere (17)
| Dave Bing (7)
| Boston Garden8,429
| 2–1
|- align="center" bgcolor="#ffcccc"
| 4
| March 28
| Boston
| L 110–135
| Dave Bing (26)
| Dave DeBusschere (10)
| Dave Bing (6)
| Cobo Arena11,294
| 2–2
|- align="center" bgcolor="#ffcccc"
| 5
| March 31
| @ Boston
| L 96–110
| Dave DeBusschere (26)
| Dave DeBusschere (23)
| Eddie Miles (4)
| Boston Garden8,093
| 2–3
|- align="center" bgcolor="#ffcccc"
| 6
| April 1
| Boston
| L 103–111
| Dave Bing (44)
| Dave DeBusschere (14)
| Dave Bing (4)
| Cobo Arena9,483
| 2–4
|-

Awards and records
Dave Bing, All-NBA First Team

References

Detroit Pistons seasons
Detroit
Detroit Pistons
Detroit Pistons